Mary Dearborn is an American biographer and author. Dearborn has published biographies of Norman Mailer, Henry Miller, Peggy Guggenheim and others.

Dearborn received a Ph.D. in English and comparative literature from Columbia University in 1984.

Works

Biographies
 Pocahontas's Daughters: Gender and Ethnicity in American Culture (1986)
 Love in the Promised Land: The Story of Anzia Yezierska and John Dewey (1988)
 The Happiest Man Alive: A Biography of Henry Miller (1991)
 Queen of Bohemia: The Life of Louise Bryant (1996)
 Mailer: A Biography (1999)
 Mistress of Modernism: The Life of Peggy Guggenheim (2004)
 Ernest Hemingway: A Biography (2017)

Introductions
 Henry Miller, Crazy Cock (1991)
 Henry Miller, Moloch: or, This Gentile World (1992)

External links
Official website

References

American biographers
American women biographers
Living people
Brown University alumni
Columbia Graduate School of Arts and Sciences alumni
Year of birth missing (living people)